Rose Cottage may refer to:

 Morgue (a euphemism)

in the United Kingdom
Rose Cottage, Sulby Road, Sulby, Isle of Man, one of Isle of Man's Registered Buildings

in the United States
Rose Cottage (Pineville, Louisiana), listed on the National Register of Historic Places in Louisiana
Rose Cottage/Peyton House, Charlottesville, Virginia, listed on the National Register of Historic Places in Charlottesville, Virginia